Mordellistena neuwaldeggiana is a species of beetle in the family Mordellidae. It was described by Georg Wolfgang Franz Panzer in 1796. It is widely distributed in Europe.

References

neuwaldeggiana
Beetles of Europe
Beetles described in 1796
Taxa named by Georg Wolfgang Franz Panzer